Liga ASOBAL 2006–07 season was the 17th since its establishment. A total of 16 teams competed this season for the championship.

Competition format
The competition was played in a round-robin format, through 30 rounds. The team with most points earned wins the championship. The last two teams were relegated.

Overall standing

BM Altea was relegated due to financial troubles. Thus, Teka Cantabria remained in Liga ASOBAL.

Conclusions
 BM Ciudad Real -- EHF Champions League and Liga ASOBAL Champion
 Portland San Antonio -- EHF Champions League
 Caja España Ademar León -- EHF Champions League
 FC Barcelona Handbol -- EHF Champions League
 BM Valladolid -- EHF Cup Winner's Cup
 CAI BM Aragón -- EHF Cup
 BM Granollers -- EHF Cup
 Teka Cantabria—Relegated to División de Honor B 
 Bidasoa Irún—Relegated to División de Honor B

Top goal scorers

Top goalkeepers

References

Liga ASOBAL seasons
1
Spain